WWE Anthology is a compilation album by WWE. Released on November 12, 2002 by Koch Records, it features entrance theme music of various WWE wrestlers and events. The album is the first on which the company is named WWE, after it was renamed from World Wrestling Federation (WWF) in May 2002. The album was a commercial success, charting at number 13 on the US Billboard 200.

Composition
The three-disc WWE Anthology was categorised by music website AllMusic in the genres of hard rock and heavy metal. The album features entrance theme music of various WWE wrestlers from different eras of the company's history up until the album's release, including "The Federation Years" (such as Hulk Hogan's "Real American", Bret Hart's "Hitman" and Shawn Michaels's "Sexy Boy"), "The Attitude Era" (such as D-Generation X's "Break It Down", The Rock's "If You Smell..." and Stone Cold Steve Austin's "I Won't Do What You Tell Me") and the modern era.

Release
WWE Anthology was released on November 12, 2002 by Koch Records in association with SmackDown! Records, a division of WWE. Announcing the album, a WWE press release described the album as a "collection featuring the greatest hits, past and present, of WWE Superstar Entrance and Event themes", all but 38 of the featured tracks had never been previously released.

Reception

Commercial
WWE Anthology was a commercial success. In the US, the album reached number 13 on the US Billboard 200, as well as topping the Independent Albums chart and reaching number two on the Top Soundtracks chart. It was certified platinum by the Recording Industry Association of America, indicating sales of over 1 million units, in only ten days of its release. The album was also certified silver by the British Phonographic Industry in the United Kingdom.

Critical
Music website AllMusic awarded WWE Anthology four out of five stars. Reviewer Bradley Torreano praised the album for its comprehensive nature, noting that "for completists this is the premier collection of WWF/WWE music up to this point, bar none". Torreano hailed the second disc (titled "The Attitude Era") as the highlight, but condemned the third disc (titled "NOW!") as documenting "the fall of the company", describing the music as "mostly boring".

Track listing
All songs written and performed by Jim Johnston, except where noted.
"Deadly Game", featured in the "Attitude Era" section, is labeled as the theme of In Your House, when it was actually the theme of the 1998 Survivor Series pay-per-view. "The End", featured in the "NOW!" section, is incorrectly noted as being the theme from Judgment Day when it is in fact from the Armageddon pay-per-view. "The Game", featured in the "NOW!" section, is labeled as Triple H's theme, when it is actually a rap-style lyrical, unused version of Triple H's 2000 "My Time" instrumental mix (the version used by Triple H was subsequently released in 2020 on the Uncaged XIV digital release under the title "Game Time").
Upon purchase of the album, buyers were provided with a code which, when entered on the website promoting the album, would allow download of a bonus track, titled "Billy Kidman". That track would later be released on ThemeAddict: WWE The Music, Vol. 6 under the title "You Can Run". "Brawl for All", featured in the "Attitude Era" section, is labeled as the theme for WWF Brawl for All, when it was actually eventually used for the first incarnation of the XFL. The actual theme song for Brawl for All would eventually be released on WWE: Uncaged VII.

Personnel

Rick Derringer – vocals ("Real American")
Jimmy Hart – vocals ("Sexy Boy")
John Joyce – vocals ("No Holds Barred")
The Honky Tonk Man – vocals ("Cool Cocky Bad")
Maydie G. Myles – vocals ("Can't Get Enough" and "Eyes of Righteousness")
Sunny – vocals ("I Know You Want Me")
Fonda Feingold – vocals ("I Know You Want Me", "Tell Me a Lie" and "Who I Am", Together)
Shawn Michaels – vocals ("Sexy Boy")
Sycho Sid – vocals ("Snapped")
Owen Hart – vocals ("Enough Is Enough")
Road Dogg – vocals ("With My Baby Tonight")
Peter Bursuker – vocals ("Corporate Ministry" and "No Chance in Hell")
Earl Valentine – vocals ("Ass Man")
Ike Dirty – vocals ("California" and "Bad Man")
Prince Michael – vocals ("Fist")
Val Venis – vocals ("Hello Ladies")
Steve Sechi – horns ("Latino Heat")
Stevan Swann – vocals ("Sexual Chocolate", Together)
The Rock – vocals ("If You Smell...")
Hardcore Holly – vocals ("How Do You Like Me Now?")
Adam Morenoff – vocals ("Break Down the Walls")
Donato Paternostro – drums ("Dead Man")
Jimmy Kunes – vocals ("I'm Back")
Eamon Cronin – vocals ("Fight" and "The End")
Chris Classic – vocals ("(619)")
Jacki-O – vocals ("All Grown Up")
Lilian Garcia – vocals ("Need a Little Time")
Michael Fredo – vocals ("You Look So Good to Me")
Lordikim Allah – vocals ("Billy Kidman")

Charts

Weekly charts

Year-end charts

Certifications

See also

Music in professional wrestling

References

Anthology
WWE Anthology
WWE Anthology
WWE Anthology